Thomas Johansson was the defending champion but did not compete that year.

Jonas Björkman won in the final 6–2, 6–7(5–7), 6–2 against Wayne Arthurs.

Seeds

  Andy Roddick (first round)
  Fabrice Santoro (quarterfinals)
  Greg Rusedski (semifinals)
  Jarkko Nieminen (first round)
  Stefan Koubek (second round)
  Michel Kratochvil (semifinals)
  Magnus Larsson (quarterfinals)
  Davide Sanguinetti (second round)

Draw

Finals

Top half

Bottom half

References
 2002 Nottingham Open Singles draw

Nottingham Open
2002 ATP Tour